In enzymology, an arylformamidase is an enzyme that catalyzes the chemical reaction

N-formyl-L-kynurenine + H2O  formate + L-kynurenine

Thus, the two substrates of this enzyme are N-formyl-L-kynurenine and H2O, whereas its two products are formate and L-kynurenine.

This enzyme belongs to the family of hydrolases, those acting on carbon-nitrogen bonds other than peptide bonds, specifically in linear amides.  The systematic name of this enzyme class is aryl-formylamine amidohydrolase. Other names in common use include kynurenine formamidase, formylase, formylkynureninase, formylkynurenine formamidase, formamidase I, and formamidase II.  This enzyme participates in tryptophan metabolism and glyoxylate and dicarboxylate metabolism.

References

 
 
 

EC 3.5.1
Enzymes of unknown structure